is a girls' private school in Ichikawa, Chiba, Japan, offering education for elementary, junior high, and senior high school.

External links
  

Schools in Chiba Prefecture